Association Sportive Taissy is a French association football team.

History
The club was founded on August 25, 1909.  They are based in Taissy, France and had been playing in the Championnat de France Amateurs 2 Group A, the fifth tier in the French football league system. They play at the Stade Municipal Jules Vastag in Taissy.

Honours
 Champion de DH Champagne-Ardenne : 2004
 Champion de DHR : 2002
 Champion de PL : 2000

Notable coaches
 Quentin Rogier
 Alphonse Tchami
 Jérôme Velfert

Sponsor
 RM IMMO

Notes

External links
 Official site

1990 establishments in France
Association football clubs established in 1990
Sport in Marne (department)
Football clubs in Grand Est